Land of Illusion Starring Mickey Mouse, released in Japan as  and in Brazil as Land of Illusion Estrelando Mickey Mouse, is a platform game developed and published by Sega for the Master System and Game Gear.

Plot
When starting up the game, a short movie is shown. Mickey falls asleep with a book of fairy tales in his lap, later he wakes up in a strange village. A girl (looking like Daisy Duck) comes up to him asking him for help. She says the village's magic crystal' has been stolen by an evil Phantom. As a result, the beautiful happiness in her village has been replaced with sadness. Deciding to help the villagers, Mickey sets out to the North Mountains, to find the Princess who knows how to reach the Phantom's Castle in the Clouds.

The game's story has no direct connections to either its predecessor, Castle of Illusion, or its sequel, World of Illusion.

Gameplay
Land of Illusion is a typical platform game, with the player sidescrolling his way through 14 stages, trying to retrieve the crystal to the villagers. Mickey can attack his enemies by picking up an item (such as a stone block) and throwing it at his enemies, or he can jump at them in a sitting pose. The stages consist of the Forest, Lake, Blacksmith's Castle, Castle Ruins, Tiny Cavern, Flower Field, Toy Workshop, Palace Ruins, Craggy Cliff, Desert, Good Princess's Castle, Sand Castle, Island, and the Phantom's Castle.

Throughout the game, the player can pick up items that imbue Mickey with new abilities, such as a rope for climbing up walls or a potion that can make Mickey shrink in size. Furthermore, the player can then return to previous levels and utilize these items to gain access to previously inaccessible areas.

Mickey begins the game with two power stars indicating how many hits he can take by enemies. Power stars can be collected throughout the game to give Mickey more health to a maximum of 5. However, there is one power star on every level making 14 in total. Each star collected after collecting 5 gives full health and an extra try. Most of them are in inaccessible areas which require many of the special items collected throughout the game. Upon completion of the game, the number of stars the player collects is tallied. Collecting all 14 stars gives a special score bonus.

Characters
Several well-known Disney characters appear in the game:
Mickey Mouse – The main character of the game.
Phantom – The antagonist of the game. He is the same Horned King who appears in the Disney animated film, The Black Cauldron and the House of Mouse, but is colored differently.
Daisy Duck – A villager who asks for Mickey's help saving the village.
Goofy – A toymaker.
Horace Horsecollar – The blacksmith.
Minnie Mouse – The princess and continued love interest of Mickey.
Donald Duck – The king.

Reception

The game was generally well-received by critics. Nottingham Post gave the game gear version 88% commenting: "The graphics are cute and the game is straightforward and challenging enough to appeal to just about anybody."

See also
List of Disney video games

References

External links

Land of Illusion Manual

1993 video games
Video games about dreams
Fantasy video games
Video games about magic
Master System games
Mickey Mouse video games
Game Gear games
Sega video games
Side-scrolling platform games
Single-player video games
Video games developed in Japan